Palashipara Assembly constituency is an assembly constituency in Nadia district in the Indian state of West Bengal.

Overview
As per orders of the Delimitation Commission, No. 79 Palashipara Assembly constituency is composed of the following: Chanderghat and Patharghata II gram panchayats of Tehatta I CD Block, Tehatta II CD Block, and Bikrampur, Bilkumari, Dhananjaypur and Haranagar gram panchayats of Nakashipara CD Block.

Palashipara Assembly constituency is part of 12. Krishnanagar Lok Sabha Constituency.

Members of Legislative Assembly

For MLAs in the area prior to 1977 see Tehatta Assembly constituency

Election results

2021

2016
In the 2016 election, Tapas Kumar Saha of AITMC defeated previous M.L.A. S.M. Sadi of CPI(M)

2011
In the 2011 election, S.M.Sadi of CPI(M) defeated his nearest rival Prof. Manik Bhattacharjee of All India Trinamool Congress

 

.# Swing calculated on Congress+Trinamool Congress vote percentages taken together in 2006.

1977–2006
In the 2006 state assembly elections, Biswanath Ghosh of CPI(M) won the Palashipara assembly seat defeating his nearest rival Tapas Kumar Saha of TMC. Contests in most years were multicornered but only winners and runners are being mentioned. Kamalendu Sanyal (Former Minister of State) of CPI(M) defeated Tapas Kumar Saha of TMC in 2001, Ujjal Biswas of Congress in 1996 and Kartic Chandra Biswas of Congress in 1991. Madhabendu Mahanta of CPI(M) defeated Kumaresh Chandra of Congress in 1987, and Kartic Chandra Biswas of Congress in 1982 and 1977. Prior to that the constituency did not exist. Tehatta Assembly constituency existed in the area.

References

Assembly constituencies of West Bengal
Politics of Nadia district